Jasmin is an unincorporated community in the Canadian province of Saskatchewan. Listed as a designated place by Statistics Canada, the community had a population of 5 in the Canada 2011 Census.

Demographics

See also 
 List of communities in Saskatchewan

References 

Ituna Bon Accord No. 246, Saskatchewan
Former designated places in Saskatchewan
Former villages in Saskatchewan
Unincorporated communities in Saskatchewan
Division No. 10, Saskatchewan